Phospholipase A2, group IVB (cytosolic), also known as PLA2G4B, is a human gene.

References

Further reading